Chenareh (also Romanized as Chenāreh and Chenārah; also known as Chinare and Chināreh) is a city and capital of Sarshiv District, in Marivan County, Kurdistan Province, Iran. At the 2006 census, its population was 433, in 101 families. The city is populated by Kurds.

References

Towns and villages in Marivan County
Cities in Kurdistan Province
Kurdish settlements in Kurdistan Province